is the name of many Buddhist temples in Japan. For some of the temples, the reading is Shōbō-ji.

Shōbō-ji (Higashiyama-ku) in Higashiyama-ku, Kyoto
Shōbō-ji (Kumano) in Kumano, Mie
Shōbō-ji (Nishikyō-ku) in Nishikyō-ku, Kyoto
Shōbō-ji (Ōamishirasato) in Ōamishirasato, Chiba
Shōbō-ji (Ōtsu) in Ōtsu, Shiga
Shōbō-ji (Ōshū) in Ōshū, Iwate
Shōbō-ji (Yawata) in Yawata, Kyoto
Shōhō-ji (Gifu) in Gifu, Gifu
Shōhō-ji (Hakodate) in Hakodate, Hokkaido
Shōhō-ji (Higashimatsuyama) in Higashimatsuyama, Saitama
Shōhō-ji (Miki) in Miki, Hyōgo